The Four Step Brothers were an American dance group. The group started out as a trio in 1925, with the original members, Maceo Anderson, Al Williams and Red Walker. Although their original name was the Step Brothers, because that was also the name of another famous young tap dancing quartet, they subsequently changed their name to "The Three Step Brothers."  In 1927, after accepting a new member, Sherman Robinson, they became The Four Step Brothers. Dubbed "The Eight Feet of Rhythm," the group soon traveled with Duke Ellington. While starring with the "Brothers," Anderson also appeared at the Hoofers Club and worked part-time as a newsboy.

The quartet was the first black act to perform at Radio City Music Hall, the first to appear at the Chez Paree Club in Chicago and the first to break television's color bar.

Style and moves
The group became known for their complex dance routines. The "Brothers" incorporated snake hips, five-tap wings, slides, rhythm (jazz) tap, the camel walk, the strut, straight acrobatics, etc. They tried not to change their dance steps except to make them better or when incorporating new dancers. They were known for their "challenge dances" in which they tried to outdo one another in routines that used no music. Each dancer would solo while the other dancers stood back, clapping hands and stomping feet.

Career
The Four Step Brothers played the Cotton Club for four years, traveled the Keith-Orpheum circuit and the "Chitlin' Circuit," danced annually (for a decade) at Radio City Music Hall, and went around the world four times. They toured twelve European countries, receiving standing ovations from royalty. In the U.S., they danced for presidents Truman and Eisenhower.

They appeared in numerous films including Check and Double Check (1930), the Vitaphone short Barbershop Blues (1933), When Johnny Comes Marching Home Again (1942), It Ain't Hay (1943), Rhythm of the Islands (1943), Carolina Blues (1944), Greenwich Village (1944), That's My Gal (1947), Here Come the Girls (1953), and The Patsy (1964).

In 1950, they appeared on Milton Berle's Texaco Theater, over the objections of the show's sponsor. Berle wrote in his autobiography:

During the 1950s and 1960s, the "Brothers" appeared on The Ed Sullivan Show, the ABC variety program The Guy Mitchell Show, on Bob Hope specials, and in telecasts featuring Dean Martin and Jerry Lewis, Perry Como and Steve Allen.

The Four Step Brothers became one of the longest-lasting dance groups, surviving for more than four decades into the 1960s.

The Dance Masters of America awarded the group a lifetime achievement award in 1960, and again in 1985 for helping to break the color barrier. In 1988, they received their own star on the Hollywood Walk of Fame.

Members
Other members of the group during its long tenure included Sylvester "Happy" Johnson; Prince Spencer, who joined the group in 1941 replacing Johnson; Freddie James, who performed with the group from 1939 to 1943; Rufus "Flash" McDonald, who joined the act in 1943 when James left; Ernie "Sunshine Sammy" Morrison; and Norman Rowe.

When Prince Spencer left the group to go into the Chicago grocery business, he was replaced by Edward Bozeman. Before his Step Brother days, Bozeman also danced professionally under the name of “Prince.” The name was not the only coincidence. Like Spencer, Bozeman did the acrobatics and flips part of the routine and always danced last, in the same spot that Spencer had held. Step Brother Flash McDonald said at the time, “Let him be himself, instead of doing Prince’s (Spencer’s) routines.” They all agreed. “They thought I was a kid, but I was 35,” Bozeman recalled. Although there is very rare footage of Edward Bozeman performing with the Four Step Brothers, he performed with them from 1964 up to the disbandment of the group in 1989-1990.

Subsequent to the addition of Bozeman, there was one other dancer who, essentially, may be considered the "final" addition to the famous dance quartet's immediate family.  In 1968, a ten year-old, acrobatic ball of energy, named Terry Criner was brought on at the end of the quartet's already superior performance. The four simultaneously pointed towards stage right and Little Terry dashed onto the stage – with a series of acrobatic moves.  His routine was very similar to Bozeman's, however; the kid added head spins, somersaults, no-hand head flip – all done with lightning speed.  Several newspapers described him as a blur. Criner, who courageously followed Bozeman, was up to the task and was acknowledged by the group's charter members as a "great addition."

Terry Criner was a fourth-grade elementary student when he was picked to share the stage with some of the greatest dancers in tap history.  Although a novice in the art of tap dancing, his acrobatic-dance skills combined landed him into a unique place in history.  Criner was the protégé of Maceo E. Anderson, one of the original members.  Criner simultaneously toured with the Step Brothers and opened as a solo act for Donald O'Connor for nearly three years.

Third Generation Steps and beyond
Criner eventually agreed with Maceo Anderson's idea of starting a new group. Initially called Four Steps and a Miss, the troupe became the Third Generation Steps. The group went on to successes of its own. In 1979, after eleven years of a rather successful show business stent, the 21-year-old Criner shocked Maceo Anderson and group members Cindy Notz and Ivery Wheeler by announcing his retirement—at the peak of the group's success.

During his performing years, Terry Criner became Nevada State Diving Champion, Clark County Theater Arts Ensemble Acting Co-Champion, and  Recipient of the DeVos Scholarship in Theater Arts to UNLV.  In 1980, he entered the gospel ministry. During those years he added United States Marine, Clark County School District New Teacher of the Year at the Intermediate Level and Middle and High School Administrator to his experiences. In 1992, Criner ordained Maceo Anderson as an elder in the church. Elder Anderson resided with the Criner family in Las Vegas, Nevada, for seven years, until he moved to Los Angeles, California.  Criner eulogized Maceo Anderson at his "Home-going" celebration. His favorite song was "When the Saints Go Marching In." And, Anderson's all-time favorite saying was, "Watch your step, brother!"  Dr. Terry Criner continues in ministry today as Bishop of Holy Tabernacle Outreach Mission, Inc.

References

External links

 Melbasdance.com
 Barbershop Blues (1933)

African-American male dancers
African-American dancers
American male dancers
American dance groups
American tap dancers
Harlem Renaissance
Performing groups established in 1925
Organizations disestablished in 1990